The  NCAA baseball tournament was the third NCAA-sanctioned baseball tournament that determined a national champion. The tournament was held as the conclusion of the 1949 NCAA baseball season. The College World Series was played at Wichita Municipal Stadium in Wichita, Kansas from June 22 to June 25. The third tournament's champion was the Texas Longhorns, coached by Bibb Falk. The Most Outstanding Player was named for the first time, with the inaugural award going to Tom Hamilton of Texas. This was the first of six championships for the Longhorns through the 2019 season.

Tournament
The tournament was divided into four regional brackets, Region A, Region B, Region C and Region D, with each region consisting of two teams playing a best-of-three-game series. The winner of each bracket advanced to the College World Series. This was the first and only year of this format.

Field
As in previous years, each representative of the eight districts were determined by a mix of selection committees, conference champions, and district playoffs.

Region A
At Brooklyn, New York June 13

Region B
At South Bend, Indiana June 17–18

Region C
At Austin, Texas June 16–17

Region D
At Los Angeles, California June 16–17

College World Series
Following financial losses in Kalamazoo, Michigan the previous year, the NCAA moved the tournament to Wichita for the 1949 edition. This would be the only year in Wichita, as the 1950 edition would take place in Omaha, Nebraska, as it has every year through 2019.

Participants

Results

Bracket

Game results

Notable players
 Southern California: Jim Brideweser, Rudy Regalado
 St. John's: Jack Kaiser
 Texas: Charlie Gorin, Tom Hamilton, Murray Wall
 Wake Forest: Charlie Teague

Notes

References

Tournament
NCAA Division I Baseball Championship
NCAA baseball tournament
NCAA baseball tournament
NCAA baseball tournament
NCAA baseball tournament
NCAA baseball tournament
NCAA baseball tournament
NCAA baseball tournament
History of Austin, Texas
History of South Bend, Indiana
History of Wichita, Kansas
Baseball competitions in Indiana
Baseball competitions in Kansas
Baseball competitions in Los Angeles
Baseball competitions in New York City
Baseball in Austin, Texas
Sports competitions in Texas
Sports competitions in Wichita, Kansas
Sports in Brooklyn
Sports in South Bend, Indiana